Telling Whoppers is a 1926 short silent comedy film directed by Robert F. McGowan and nephew Anthony Mack. It was the 55th Our Gang short subject released.

Plot
The neighborhood bully, Tuffy, played by Johnny Downs, is determined to lick every boy in the neighborhood. He beats up one boy, makes Jay and Jackie stand on their heads, and makes Bonedust and Scooter bark like a dog. Along comes Joe and Farina wearing bandages, and pretending to be too disabled to fight, but Tuffy beats them up anyway. Joe and Farina encourage the boys to band together and they then chase the bully off. The gang retires to their hideout and draw lots to decide who should finish the bully off. On second thought, Tuffy was swimming and was not allowed in the premises. Joe and Farina draw the unlucky lots and go looking for the bully, but Peggy tells them that Tuffy has moved to Chicago. Joe and Farina return with the lie that they beat Tuffy up and threw him in the lake. At the end of it, Tuffy's mother spanked him.

Cast

The Gang
 Joe Cobb as Joe
 Jackie Condon as Jackie
 Allen Hoskins as Farina
 Scooter Lowry as Skooter
 Jay R. Smith as Jay R.
 Bobby Young as Bonedust
 Billy Naylor as Billy

Additional cast
 Johnny Downs as Tuffy Thompson
 Peggy Eames as Peggy
 Charles McAvoy as Officer
 Gene Morgan as Officer
 Dorothy Vernon as Tuffy's mother
 S. D. Wilcox as Officer
 Charley Young as man near swimming hole
 Diamond the Dog as himself
 Pal the Dog as himself

See also
 Our Gang filmography

References

External links

1926 films
American black-and-white films
Films directed by Robert F. McGowan
Films directed by Robert A. McGowan
Hal Roach Studios short films
American silent short films
Our Gang films
1926 comedy films
1920s American films
Silent American comedy films
1920s English-language films